

1905–06 season

Schedule and results

1906–07 season

Schedule and results

1907–08 season

Schedule and results

1908–09 season

Schedule and results

Notes and references

1906